Digital Blasphemy is a commercial website for computer wallpapers designed and created by independent Computer-generated imagery artist Ryan Bliss, an English and Computer Science graduate from the University of Iowa. The name Digital Blasphemy was chosen because of the "Godlike" feeling Bliss experienced when creating worlds through artwork.

The site is subscription-based, but a free gallery is available to non-members.  Images in the free gallery are rotated regularly with fresh images, and are presented in various screen resolutions.  In addition, the free gallery provides multi-monitor samples and mobile device images for Android devices, as well as BlackBerry, iPhone, and Palm.  The member gallery includes all available artwork numbering over 820, not including image alternate forms.

Some images have additional forms and are in a section known as the "Picklejar". This provides the same images in different colors or presentations, or similar images with removed, added, or changed content or elements. At times, the original image ends up in the Picklejar section and the updated and improved image takes its place in the main gallery. A way to browse Pickle Jar images was added in June 2014.

Designs
Typical designs include science fiction and fantasy, space imagery, planetscapes, landscapes, cityscapes, seascapes, underwater scenes, interiors, abstracts, fractals. There are also images depicting seasons and seasonal events, special occasions, and holidays such as Halloween, Christmas, the Fourth of July, Saint Patrick's Day, and Valentine's Day.

Wallpapers come in many display resolutions up to 7680 x 1600, including widescreen and multi-monitor formats to accommodate various monitor configurations. Only subscribers have access to the highest resolution wallpapers.  As of July 2007, many wallpapers were converted to display on mobile devices such as cell phones and tablets, and the first 1080p animated wallpaper was created.

Digital Blasphemy wallpapers were used in Stardock's weather product, The Natural Desktop.

Reception

Digital Blasphemy's work has been recommended by Lifehacker, PC World, Yahoo! Internet Life,  and the G4TV television show The Screen Savers.  In January 2012 Digital Blasphemy was named "The Most Popular Wallpaper Website" by readers of Lifehacker.com.

At its high of popularity, Digital Blasphemy's most popular works included Tropic of Cancer and Tropic of Capricorn.

References

External links
 Digital Blasphemy

Art websites